HDMS Niels Juel was a training ship built for the Royal Danish Navy between 1914 and 1923. Originally designed before World War I as a monitor, construction was slowed by the war and she was redesigned as a training cruiser. Completed in 1923 she made training cruises to the Black and Mediterranean Seas, South America and numerous shorter visits to ports in northern Europe. The ship often served as a flagship and occasionally was used as a royal yacht for visits to overseas possessions and other countries.

Niels Juel was extensively modernized in the mid-1930s and remained operational after Nazi Germany occupied Denmark in 1940. When the Germans attempted to seize the Danish Fleet in August 1943, the ship attempted to escape to Sweden, but was attacked and damaged by German bombers. She was deliberately run aground by her crew to deny the ship to the Germans, but Niels Juel was not badly damaged. The ship was refloated several months later and repaired by the Germans. They renamed her Nordland and used her as a training ship. She was scuttled by them in May 1945 and her wreck was salvaged in 1952.

Background
Like that class, she had a very low freeboard, and was intended to be armed with two  guns in single gun turrets fore and aft of the superstructure and a secondary armament of eight  guns. The Danes ordered the main guns and their turrets from Krupp of Germany in July, a month before the start of World War I, but the order was suspended when the war began. After being laid down in September 1914, construction of the ship was severely delayed by shortages of labor and material and she was not launched until 1918.

Reports from battles between the British and the Germans caused the Danes to change her secondary armament to  guns in 1917, but work stopped completely when the war ended on 11 November 1918. Danish politicians believed that the 30.5-centimeter guns could be viewed as provocative by their neighbors and they decided to convert the ship into an innocuous training ship by adding an extra deck to the existing hull and changing the main armament to  guns. The new design was approved in 1920 and the ship was completed in 1923.

Description

Niels Juels crew numbered between 310 and 369 officers and sailors. Her hull was divided into 10 watertight compartments and it was fitted with a double bottom.

The forward pair of boilers were oil fired and the after pair were coal burning.

Armament and fire control
The Navy had difficulties procuring the 15-centimeter guns that it wanted for the ship's main battery, rejecting proposals from French, British and Swedish manufacturers as unsatisfactory. Although Krupp was not allowed to deliver finished guns by the terms of the Versailles Treaty, it worked out a deal with the Swedish Bofors company, which would finish and deliver the guns to the Danes. Niels Juel mounted ten 15-centimeter P.K. L/45 guns, a pair side-by-side on the forecastle forward of the superstructure, three on each broadside amidships, and a superfiring pair aft of the superstructure, all protected by gun shields.

A pair of  A.B.K. L/30 anti-aircraft guns were mounted on a platform abaft the funnel. The mounts had a maximum elevation of 70° and the gun had an effective rate of fire of about 16 rounds per minute. The ship was fitted with a pair of submerged  torpedo tubes, one on each broadside.

The ship was provided with a pair of  Zeiss stereoscopic rangefinders, one on the roof of the conning tower and the other on a platform abaft the mainmast. Data from the rangefinders was sent to the transmitting station located on the main deck beneath the conning tower, where it was converted into elevation and deflection data for use by the guns.

Protection
Niels Juel was protected by Krupp cemented armor (KCA) made by Bethlehem Steel. The shields of the 15-centimeter guns had  faces and  sides. The  deck plates rested on the top edge of the belt armor and were not made from KCA. The conning tower had  of armor on the sides with a  roof.

Modifications and modernization
The following year it was replaced by a Zeiss  coincidence rangefinder. When Niels Juel was modernized in 1935 and 1936, the first priority was to upgrade her fire-control systems. Her tripod mast was replaced by a pole mast surmounted by a two-story director-control tower that was fitted with a Dutch Hazemeyer gunnery director that fed information to the analog gunnery computer in the transmitting station below. The Navy purchased three  rangefinders from Zeiss to re-equip the ship, replaced the obsolete 57-millimeter AA guns with ten Madsen  RK M/31 autocannon in five twin-gun mounts, and added tanks for a chemical smoke screen at the ship's stern. In April 1937, her anti-aircraft armament was augmented with fourteen  Madsen R.K. L/75 M/37 machine guns in twin mounts. In early 1941 a pair of 40-millimeter Bofors light AA guns in single mounts that had been removed from a pair of submarines were added. A year later the existing 8 and 20 mm weapons were replaced by 10 faster-firing Madsen 20-millimeter L/60 M/41 autocannon in single mounts.

Construction and career
Niels Juel, named after the Danish admiral of the same name, was laid down on 21 September 1914 at the Orlogsværftet (Royal Danish Naval Shipyard) in Copenhagen. The ship was launched on 3 July 1918, but she was stuck on the slipway for over an hour before she could be freed to slide into the water. Construction halted a few months later as her design was reconsidered. Construction began again in 1920 to a new design and she was commissioned in May 1923 and began a working up cruise on 28 May, with Crown Prince Frederick aboard, visiting the Faeroe Islands, Bergen, Norway, Leith, Scotland and Gothenburg, Sweden, before returning home on 6 August.

On 21 October Niels Juel made her first training cruise, visiting Dartmouth, United Kingdom, Cadiz, Spain, Madeira, Portugal, and the Cape Verde Islands, en route to South America. On her return voyage, she encountered a severe storm after leaving the Azores that broke her rudder chains and she had to be steered using only her propellers until emergency steering could be rigged. The ship returned home on 23 February 1924, after getting repairs in Plymouth, United Kingdom. Niels Juel became the flagship of the gunnery training squadron later that year and then later flagship of the general training squadron. In 1925, she made brief visits to Finland, Estonia, Latvia and Germany. The following year the ship made a cruise to the Faeroe Islands and Iceland with the royal family aboard. Niels Juel served as the royal yacht for a state visit to Finland in 1928, during which she was escorted by the cruiser .

The ship made a training cruise to the Mediterranean in 1929, where she visited ports in France, Spain, Italy and Libya as well as Lisbon, Portugal. She resumed her position as flagship of the training squadron on her return. Beginning on 22 May 1930, Niels Juel served as a royal yacht for a royal tour of the Faeroes and Iceland as well as serving as a training ship for naval cadets. The following year, she became the first Danish warship to visit the Black Sea when she visited Istanbul, Turkey, Odessa in the Soviet Union, and ports in Greece, Italy, Algeria, and France on her way home. Niels Juel was decommissioned on 3 September 1931 after her return. The ship was modernized in 1935 and 1936 and recommissioned on 9 July and then spent the rest of 1936 working up.

Niels Juel was present at the Fleet review in Spithead for George VI of the United Kingdom on 20 May 1937 and later participated in a fleet exercise that culminated in a visit to Helsingborg, Sweden. In 1938 she accompanied the torpedo boat flotilla on a visit to Turku, Finland in August, and visited Sønderborg, Denmark, the following month with the rest of the training squadron. A planned training cruise to the United States to visit the 1939 New York World's Fair in May was cancelled as a result of rising tensions in Europe and Niels Juel trained with the mobilized Peder Skram from May to July. In late August the ship was preparing for a visit to Oslo, Norway, but that was cancelled when she was ordered to fuze all her shells in preparation for war. Her crew was filled out as the Navy mobilized and Niels Juel joined the rest of the fleet near Aarhus. Winter ice forced the ship to return to Copenhagen in January 1940, even though that port was ice-bound as well. With little possibility of action, her crew was given leave. Her crew was recalled on 8 April, but Niels Juel was not ready for war when the Germans invaded the following day. The Germans permitted the Danes to keep their ships and allowed them to train in Danish waters.

Operation Safari

Following increasing Danish resistance to German rule and the institution of martial law on 28 August 1943, the German army moved to seize the Danish fleet in Copenhagen harbour the following morning, an action codenamed Operation Safari. Niels Juel was in Holbæk when her captain, Commander Carl Westermann, was ordered take his ship to be interned in Sweden. The Germans spotted her after she raised steam and departed. Before the ship could exit the Isefjord, Westermann was informed that the Germans had claimed they had mined the exit, and he spotted three German ships in the distance, the torpedo boat  and two E-boats. German aircraft attacked the ship with bombs and by strafing. None of the bombs hit Niels Juel, but shock damage from near misses knocked out electrical power and deformed some of the hull plating and bulkheads. Realising there was little hope of reaching Sweden, Westermann decided to run the ship aground near Nykøbing Sjælland.  The crew then tried to scuttle the ship, but an initial attempt to blow up the ship failed. The crew settled for flooding the magazine, opening the sea-cocks to flood the rest of the hull as well as systematically destroying the equipment before the Germans could take over the ship.

1944 to 1952
The Germans used a German company to salvage the ship in October and towed it to Kiel, Germany, for repair. She was disarmed, renamed Nordland, and commissioned into the Kriegsmarine in September 1944 after which she became a stationary training ship at Stolpmünde (modern Ustka, Poland). On 18 February 1945 the ship steamed to Kiel to avoid the advancing Russian forces. On 3 May, she was scuttled for the second time in the Eckernførde inlet. The wreck was partially dismantled by unauthorized salvagers before the Danes sold it to a German firm in 1952 for scrap. They removed everything above the sea bed, but its remains lie under  of water.

Notes

Citations

Bibliography

 
 
 

1918 ships
Ships built in Copenhagen
Coastal defence ships of the Royal Danish Navy
Scuttled vessels
Naval ships of Denmark captured by Germany during World War II
Maritime incidents in August 1943
Maritime incidents in May 1945
World War II coastal defence ships